Political Research Associates (PRA), formerly Midwest Research, Chicago (1981–87) is a non-profit research group located in Somerville, Massachusetts.

Mission
PRA studies the U.S. political right wing, as well as white supremacists, and paramilitary organizations. It has a full-time staff of six. The Executive Director is Tarso Luis Ramos. Dr. Jean V. Hardisty was the founder and director from 1981 to 2004. Chip Berlet was the group's senior analyst from 1981–2011. Peggy Shinner (a poet) was the first archivist. 

PRA publishes a journal, The Public Eye, quarterly, which reports on specific and current movements or trends within the U.S. political Right, and also produces special reports, past examples of which include "Calculated Compassion: How the Ex-Gay Movement Serves the Right's Attacks on Democracy," authored by former PRA research analyst, Surina Khan," which details attacks on gays and lesbians, and "Decades of Distortion," which alleged scapegoating of welfare recipients.

The group provides public speakers, and has staff on hand to answer queries from journalists, researchers, and activists. Its annual funding of approximately $700,000 per year comes from foundation grants, individual contributions, and the sale of research materials.  Expenditures are directed toward staffing, general & administrative expenses, programs and fundraising. Among its major donors are the Public Welfare Foundation and the Ford Foundation.

PRA is supported by a number of progressive and liberal activists, including Anne Braden of the Southern Organizing Committee, and Suzanne Pharr of the Highlander Research Center. Pharr has written that PRA "sets the standard for researchers and political analysts of integrity," and describes the group's research as "thorough, thoughtful, carefully researched, and presented within a broad context of understanding of the complex relationships and activities of the Right."

Founding and early history
What is now Political Research Associates in Massachusetts began as a small progressive Chicago think tank called Midwest Research. The organization was founded by Jean V. Hardisty, a professor of history. Hardisty had been hired by the American Civil Liberties Union of Illinois to conduct research on the rise of the anti-feminist and anti-abortion movements. She wrote her report for the ACLU, and then left academia to devote herself full time to defending democracy and human rights against organized attacks by right wing groups and movements.

The first two people hired by Dr. Hardisty were Peggy Shinner, a poet and writer, and Chip Berlet, a journalist and photographer.

When Hardisty was diagnosed with Non-Hodgkins Lymphoma, she was referred to a medical center in Boston. Shinner chose to stay in Chicago with her partner. However, Chip Berlet and his spouse moved to the Boston area. After a few examinations in Boston, Hardisty was told her best treatment would be received in Oklahoma. She left the organization she founded in the hands of her staff. She later returned to resume her leadership position.

The year 1994 saw a rising wave of violence against persons in (or even suspected of being supportive of) LGBTQ communities. Hardisty contacted nationally-known organizers and strategists Suzanne Pharr and Loretta Ross and raised funds for a national strategy meeting at the Blue Mountain Center in the Adirondacks. What emerged was "A Call to Defend Democracy and Pluralism", November 17, 1994.

Hardisty testified as an expert witness in the court fight over Colorado’s Amendment 2, described by human rights groups as "homophobic". She was accompanied by staff member Chip Berlet and numerous boxes of documents prepared for submission as evidence in the case. The case defending Amendment Two quickly collapsed.

Hardisty is listed in the Chicago LGBT Hall of Fame.

See also 
 Clouds Blur the Rainbow: The Other Side of New Alliance Party, a 1987 report by Chip Berlet.
 Media Matters, a progressive watchdog that criticizes and monitors news media (especially the right & far right).

References

 Mantilla, Karla. “Report says right wing is full of shit.” Off Our Backs, Vol. 28, No. 4, p. 3.
 Davis-Cohen, Simon. “Sheriffs Collude with Anti-Immigrant Group.” The Progressive, Vol. 83, No. 4, August 2019, pp. 23–24.

External links 
PoliticalResearch.org - The Website of Political Research Associates

Political science organizations
American journalism organizations